Albi Prifti (born 5 August 1993 in Fier) is an Albanian retired footballer who played for Apolonia Fier in the Albanian Superliga. His older brother Andi also plays for Apolonia Fier.

References

1993 births
Living people
Sportspeople from Fier
Association football midfielders
Albanian footballers
KF Apolonia Fier players
Kategoria Superiore players
Kategoria e Parë players